Mount Cordwell is a mountain  east of the Burch Peaks and  south-southwest of Stor Hanakken Mountain in Enderby Land. It was plotted from air photos taken from Australian National Antarctic Research Expeditions aircraft in 1957, and was named by the Antarctic Names Committee of Australia for T.S. Cordwell, a radio officer at Wilkes Station in 1961.

See also 
Mount Jewell, mountain 3 nautical miles (6 km) south of Mount Cordwell

References

External links 

Mountains of Enderby Land